Kentucky Route 2262 (KY 2262) is a  state highway in Kentucky and a small portion of Indiana.

Route description 
Its southern terminus is at the corner of JR Miller Boulevard and Parrish Avenue (KY 54) in downtown Owensboro. It then crosses the original alignment of U.S. Route 60 (US 60) and the Ohio River via the Owensboro Bridge and terminates at the end of that bridge, which marks the Kentucky-Indiana state line. The road continues as Indiana State Road 161 (SR 161) into Spencer County, Indiana.

History 
Af first, KY 75 connected with SR 75 on the bridge from the bridge's 1940 opening to the early 1950s. From 1952 until the 2001–02 fiscal year, US 231 followed the current KY 2262 and SR 161 alignments in the area. US 231 was rerouted onto US 60 east of Owensboro and onto a new alignment leading to the William H. Natcher Bridge in northeastern Daviess County into southern Spencer County. Originally, KY 2155 followed this alignment from 2001–02 until 2011, when the street was reassigned the current KY 2262 designation.

Major intersections

See also

List of crossings of the Ohio River

References

External links
US 231 at KentuckyRoads.com

U.S. Route 231
2262
Transportation in Daviess County, Kentucky
Owensboro, Kentucky